Eliseo Calenzio, Latin Calentius, (1430, Apulia – 1503) was a 15th-century Italian new Latin humanist and poet.

He was tutor of Frederick of Naples, son of Ferdinand II of Naples, and friend of Jacopo Sannazaro.

His Works were published in Rome in 1503. They include the Combat des rais contre les grenouilles, imitated from Homer, and reprinted in 1738 in Rouen in an edition of the Fables choisies by Jean de La Fontaine set in Latin verse, published by abbot Jean Saas.

Sources

Epistolae ad Hiaracum 
 Eliseo Calenzio on data.bnf.fr

People from Apulia
Italian poets
15th-century Latin writers
16th-century Latin-language writers
Italian Renaissance humanists
1430 births
1503 deaths